Liu Yaoxin (born 26 December 1997) is a Chinese footballer who currently plays for China League One side Beijing Renhe.

Club career
Liu Yaoxin was promoted to Chinese Super League side Tianjin TEDA's first team squad in 2018. On 30 September 2018, he made his debut for the club in a 1–0 away defeat against Guizhou Hengfeng, coming on as a substitute for Qiu Tianyi in the 90th minute.

Career statistics
.

References

External links

1997 births
Living people
Association football midfielders
Chinese footballers
Footballers from Tianjin
Tianjin Jinmen Tiger F.C. players
Beijing Renhe F.C. players
Chinese Super League players
China League One players
Chinese expatriate footballers
Expatriate footballers in Portugal
Chinese expatriate sportspeople in Portugal